Events in the year 2021 in North Korea.

Incumbents
 Party Chairman → Party General Secretary: Kim Jong-un
 Chairman of the State Affairs Commission: Kim Jong-un
 President of the Supreme People's Assembly: Choe Ryong-hae
 Premier: Kim Tok-hun

Events
Ongoing — COVID-19 pandemic in North Korea

From 5 January – The 8th Congress of the Workers' Party of Korea.
10 January – 8th Congress congress restored the operative functions of the General Secretary of the Workers' Party of Korea, a title previously awarded "eternally" to Kim Jong-il, and elected Kim Jong-un to it.
On January 14, a military parade took place in Kim Il-sung Square in which ballistic missiles were revealed, after a Workers' Party of Korea meeting was held by Kim Jong-un to oppose growing "US hostility." The Korean Central News Agency announced that the nuclear weapons showcased could “pre-emptively and completely destroy any enemy outside of our territory”.

Deaths
4 February – Ri Jae-il, politician, First Deputy Director of the Propaganda and Agitation Department (born 1935).
13 December – Kim Yong-ju, politician and the younger brother of Kim Il-sung (born 1920).

References

 

 
2020s in North Korea
Years of the 21st century in North Korea
North Korea
North Korea